The Hokuriku salamander (Hynobius takedai) is a species of salamander in the family Hynobiidae,  endemic to Japan. Its natural habitats are temperate forests, rivers, freshwater marshes, freshwater springs, and irrigated land. It is threatened by habitat loss.

References

Hynobius
Amphibians described in 1984
Endemic amphibians of Japan
Taxonomy articles created by Polbot
Taxa named by Masafumi Matsui
Taxa named by Kōji Miyazaki